Bazan is a Spanish surname of Navarran origin. A surname of Polish and Ukrainian origins Bazan of unrelated origin also exists, meaning pheasant. Notable people with this surname include:

XVI – XVIII century 
 Álvaro de Bazán the Elder (1506–1558), Spanish naval commander from an old Navarrese noble family
 Álvaro de Bazán, 1st Marquess of Santa Cruz (1526–1588), Spanish admiral
 Álvaro de Bazán, 2nd Marquess of Santa Cruz (1571–1646), the son of Álvaro de Bazán, 1st Marquess of Santa Cruz
 Antonio Benavides Bazán y Molina (1678 -1772),  Lieutenant General in the Spanish Army 
 Antonio Valdés y Fernández Bazán (1744–1816),  naval officer of the Spanish Royal Navy
 Ignacio de Arteaga y Bazán (1731–1783), officer of the Spanish Navy
 José Gabriel de Silva-Bazán, 10th Marquess of Santa Cruz (1782–1839), Spanish noble, first Director of the Prado Museum 
 Juan de Zúñiga Avellaneda y Bazán (1551–1608), Spanish nobleman during the reigns of Philip II and Philip III
 Juan Gregorio Bazán (1510–1570), Spanish military man

XIX – XXI century 
 Abel Bazán (1833–1903), Argentine politician and jurist
 Ada Zayas-Bazán (born 1958),  children's author, poet and teacher from Cuba
 Carlos Bazán Zender (1937–2019), Peruvian medical doctor and politician
 César Bazán Pérez (born 1974), Mexican former professional boxer 
 César Vásquez Bazán (born 1952), economist, graduate professor and Peruvian politician
 David Bazan born 1976), American indie rock singer-songwriter
 Daniel Bazán Vera (born 1973), Argentine association football forward 
 Dominador Baldomero Bazán (1937–2006), the Second Vice President of Panama from 1999 to 2004
 Emilia Pardo Bazán (1851–1921), countess of Pardo Bazán, Spanish novelist, journalist, literary critic, poet, playwright, translator, editor and professor
 Emanuel Bazán García (born 1985), Argentine footballer
 Fortunato Hernández Bazán, Mexican artisan
 Francisco De Paula Bazán (born 1980), Peruvian goalkeeper
 Geraldine Bazán (born 1983), Mexican actress, singer, and anchorwoman
 Gonzalo Ismael Bazán (born 1989), Argentine professional footballer
 Guillermo Bazan, American chemist, material scientist, and academic
 Héctor Rodrigo Bazán Chiesa (born 2001), Peruvian footballer 
 Javier Moreno Bazan (born 1984),  Spanish professional mountain biking racer
 Jorge Bazán (born 1991), Peruvian footballer
 José Luis Martínez Bazán, (1942–2015), Uruguayan football referees
 Josep Bazán (born 1933), Spanish water polo player
 Julio Bazan, Argentine journalist 
 Leandro Bazán (born 1990),  Argentinian footballer
 Leonid Bazan (born 1985), Ukrainian-born amateur, and later, Bulgarian freestyle wrestler
 Mario Bazán (born 1987), Peruvian runner 
 Mauro Ezequiel Bazan (born 1993), Argentine footballer 
 Nazareno Bazán (born 1999), Argentine professional footballer 
 Nicolas Bazan, neuroscientist and eye researcher, author, educator, mentor, developer, music enthusiast, and art lover
 Omar Bazán Flores (born 1976), Mexican politician 
 Osvaldo Bazán (1934–1997), Argentine chess player
 Henry Bazán (born 1983), Automotive engineer and entrepreneur creator of Menutopia
 Wayne Bazan (born 2008), Texan entrepreneur

See also 
 Bazan (disambiguation)
 Bazzano (disambiguation)
 Bazzani
 Basan
 Bassan (disambiguation)
 Bassani
 Basso (surname)

References

Jewish surnames
Spanish-language surnames
Basque-language surnames
Polish-language surnames
Ukrainian-language surnames